His Royal Slyness is a 1920 American short comedy film featuring Harold Lloyd. It marked the final collaboration with frequent co-star Snub Pollard, who moved on to star in his own series of films following this release. This film was remade in 1927 as Long Fliv the King which featured Oliver Hardy.

Plot
The Prince of Razzmatazz (Gaylord Lloyd) is in America being educated.  He receives a telegram telling him to travel to the Kingdom of Thermosa to vie with a drunken rival, the Prince of Roquefort (Snub Pollard), to marry "the fairest bud in the kingdom": Princess Florelle.  The Prince of Razzmatazz is unhappy about this development because he would prefer to marry his female tutor.  When the tutor sees that an American boy (Harold Lloyd) bears a striking resemblance to the prince, she convinces the American boy to take the Prince's place.  His body guard accepts a large bribe to go along with the plan.  Immediately after the American boy leaves, the prince informs his tutor that since he can no longer be a prince, he is cut off from all royal funds.  The tutor quickly turns on him and throws him out of her home.  Upon arriving in Thermosa, the American boy has to escape a violent anti-monarchist mob.  Once he gets to the palace, he has second thoughts about replacing the Prince, but he changes his mind when he sees several pretty ladies-in-waiting and Princess Florelle.  Florelle eventually chooses the American boy over the Prince of Roquefort.  Shortly afterward, the real prince arrives and exposes the American boy as a fraud.  The boy is thrown out onto the street just as the agitated anti-monarchist mob is attacking the royal palace.  The American boy accidentally fires a cannon into the palace—winning himself the new job as the country's president as the monarchy topples.  As president, he rushes back to inside the palace to rescue Florelle and her parents from the mob using his presidential powers.

Cast
 Harold Lloyd as The American Boy
 Mildred Davis as Princess Florelle of Thermosa
 Snub Pollard as Prince of Roquefort
 Gus Leonard as King Louis XIVIIX of Thermosa / Bolshevik orator
 Noah Young as Count Nichola Throwe, the Prince's tutor
 Gaylord Lloyd as The Prince of Razzamatazz (uncredited)
 Sammy Brooks (uncredited)
 William Gillespie as Courtier / Revolutionary (uncredited)
 Helen Gilmore (uncredited)
 Estelle Harrison (uncredited)
 Wallace Howe (uncredited)
 Marie Mosquini (uncredited)
 Robert Emmett O'Connor (uncredited)
 Charles Stevenson (uncredited)

See also
 Harold Lloyd filmography

External links

1920 films
1920 comedy films
1920 short films
Silent American comedy films
American silent short films
American black-and-white films
Films directed by Hal Roach
Films with screenplays by H. M. Walker
American comedy short films
1920s American films